Henry Primakoff (* February 12, 1914 in Odessa, Russian Empire, now Ukraine; † July 25, 1983 in Philadelphia, United States) was a theoretical physicist who is famous for his discovery of the Primakoff effect.

Primakoff contributed to the understanding of weak interactions, double beta decay, spin waves in ferromagnetism, and the interaction between neutrinos and the atomic nucleus. He also developed the Holstein–Primakoff transformation which is designed to treat spin waves as bosonic excitations.

In 1940 he worked at the Polytechnic Institute of Brooklyn, subsequently at the Queens College, and then at Washington University in St. Louis starting in 1946. Primakoff was the first Donner Professor of Physics in the University of Pennsylvania.  He was married to Mildred Cohn from 1938 until his death in 1983. In 1968 he was elected a member of the U.S. National Academy of Sciences. In 2011 the American Physical Society established the Henry Primakoff Award for Early-Career Particle Physics.

References

External links 
 Henry Primakoff National Academy of Sciences biographical memoirs.
 Henry Primakoff, Array of Contemporary American Physicists, AIP
 publications of primakoff,h - INSPIRE-HEP

1914 births
1983 deaths
Scientists from Odesa
Theoretical physicists
Soviet emigrants to the United States
Washington University in St. Louis faculty
Washington University physicists
Members of the United States National Academy of Sciences
University of Pennsylvania faculty
20th-century Ukrainian physicists
Odesa Jews
Jewish physicists
Fellows of the American Physical Society